Gadjamina, Gaja minah, or Eon is an elephant headed mythical figure with the body of a fish used for patulangan sarcophagi in Bali, Indonesia. The form is used for vary Balinese Clan even in Ksatrias caste as well.

See also
Makara (Hindu mythology)

References

Mythological hybrids